16S rRNA (guanine1405-N7)-methyltransferase (methyltransferase Sgm, m7G1405 Mtase, Sgm Mtase, Sgm, sisomicin-gentamicin methyltransferase, sisomicin-gentamicin methylase, GrmA, RmtB, RmtC, ArmA) is an enzyme with systematic name S-adenosyl-L-methionine:16S rRNA (guanine1405-N7)-methyltransferase. This enzyme catalyses the following chemical reaction

 S-adenosyl-L-methionine + guanine1405 in 16S rRNA  S-adenosyl-L-homocysteine + 7-methylguanine1405 in 16S rRNA

The enzyme specifically methylates guanine1405 at N7 in 16S rRNA.

References

External links 
 

EC 2.1.1